Azimuthbjerg is the highest mountain in Skjoldungen Island, SE Greenland.

Geography
This multi-peaked mountain rises steeply from the shore of the northern end of the Southern Skjoldungen Fjord, at the NW corner of Skjoldungen Island in the Sermersooq municipality. It is a  ultra-prominent peak. This mountain is marked as a  peak in the Defense Mapping Agency Greenland Navigation charts.

See also
List of mountain peaks of Greenland
List of mountains of Greenland
List of the ultra-prominent summits of North America
List of the major 100-kilometer summits of North America

References

External links
Skjoldungensund, SE Greenland (View of the Azimuthbjerg on the left of the picture)

Azimuthbjerg